The New Youngs Bay Bridge is a vertical-lift bridge over Youngs Bay on U.S. Route 101 (US 101) between Astoria and Warrenton. The road bridge had been proposed since 1948 and was approved by the state government in the late 1950s.

The bridge was built to the west of, closely in parallel to, a  railroad trestle which also crossed the bay.  It was built in 1896 for the Astoria and Columbia River Railway Company.  The New Youngs Bay Bridge passed over the top of the railway bridge near the north river bank.  The railroad bridge was used for the last time in 1982 and was dismantled in 1986.

See also
 
 
 
 List of bridges on U.S. Route 101 in Oregon
 Old Youngs Bay Bridge

References

External links
Video of bridge's lift span being raised (2012)

Buildings and structures in Astoria, Oregon
Transportation buildings and structures in Clatsop County, Oregon
Bridges completed in 1964
1964 establishments in Oregon
Vertical lift bridges in Oregon
Road bridges in Oregon
U.S. Route 101
Bridges of the United States Numbered Highway System